Adil Lamrabet, also known as Adil Lamrabat, is a Moroccan footballer. He usually plays as midfielder. Lamrabat is currently attached to IR Tanger.

References

Moroccan footballers
1979 births
Living people
Moghreb Tétouan players
People from Tétouan
Ittihad Tanger players
Ittihad Khemisset players
Association football midfielders